The Svislach or Svislač, or Svisloch , is a river in Belarus, a right tributary of the river Berezina. The name is derived from the root -visl- 'flowing,' of Indo-European origin (compare the Vistula River).

Svisłač flows through Minsk, the capital of Belarus.

Gallery

References

External links 
 

Rivers of Mogilev Region
Rivers of Minsk Region
Rivers of Minsk
Rivers of Belarus

se:Svislotj